Clotworthy Rowley, 1st Baron Langford (31 October 1763 – 13 September 1825), known as Hon. Clotworthy Taylor until 1796 and as Hon. Clotworthy Rowley from 1796 to 1800, was an Irish peer.

Langford was the fourth son of Thomas Taylor, 1st Earl of Bective, and his wife Jane Rowley, daughter of Hercules Langford Rowley and his wife Elizabeth Rowley, 1st Viscountess Langford (a title which became extinct in 1796). Thomas Taylour, 1st Marquess of Headfort, Hercules Taylour and General Robert Taylour were his elder brothers. He succeeded to the Rowley estates in 1796 and assumed the same year by Royal licence the surname of Rowley in lieu of Taylor. Rowley represented Trim in the Irish House of Commons from 1791 to 1795. Subsequently, he sat for Meath until 1800, when the Langford title was revived and Taylor was raised to the Peerage of Ireland as Baron Langford, of Summerhill in the County of Meath.

Lord Langford died in September 1825, aged 61, and was succeeded in the barony by his son Hercules.

References

Debrett's Peerage of England, Scotland, and Ireland by John Debrett; Publication date: 1820 ; pgs 612-613 https://archive.org/details/debrettspeerage04debrgoog/page/n611/mode/2up?view=theater

1763 births
1825 deaths
Barons in the Peerage of Ireland
Peers of Ireland created by George III
Irish MPs 1790–1797
Irish MPs 1798–1800
Members of the Parliament of Ireland (pre-1801) for County Meath constituencies
Younger sons of earls
Clotworthy
Place of birth missing